West Shore may refer to:

Places

Canada
 Western Communities or West Shore, the suburban municipalities of Colwood, Langford, Metchosin, View Royal, and The Highlands in British Columbia.

United Kingdom
 Earnse Bay, Cumbria, a large sand and shingle beach
 West Shore, a beach overlooking the estuary of the River Conwy in Llandudno, North Wales

United States
 West Shore (Harrisburg), Pennsylvania, a series of communities along the western shore of the Susquehanna River
 West Shore (Reading), Pennsylvania, a series of communities along the western shore of the Schuylkill River
 West Shore, Staten Island, a section of New York City

Transportation
West Shore Expressway, New York State Route 440 located on Staten Island, New York
 West Shore Railroad, a railroad connecting New York and New Jersey

Other
 West Shore (magazine), the first illustrated magazine in the U.S. state of Oregon
 West Shore School District, located in Cumberland and York counties in Pennsylvania

See also
Westshore (disambiguation)Westshore